Valeriy Zavarov (born 16 August 1988) is a professional Ukrainian football midfielder who plays for FC Obolon Kyiv in the Ukrainian Premier League. He is the son of the famous Dynamo Kyiv and Soviet Union international footballer Oleksandr Zavarov. Valeriy joined Arsenal Kyiv while his father was the head coach there. However, when Oleksandr was fired, Valeriy was also dismissed from the club, and joined Obolon Kyiv. FC Obolon Kyiv dissolved itself in February 2013.

References

External links
 Information and photo of Valeriy Zavarov at arsenal-kiev.com.ua
 Official Arsenal Kyiv Website Profile
 Profile at Official FFU Site (Ukr)

1988 births
Living people
Ukrainian footballers
FC Arsenal Kyiv players
FC Obolon-Brovar Kyiv players
Ukrainian Premier League players
Association football midfielders
Footballers from Kyiv